Sergio Munoz (born , Soria) is a Spanish male artistic gymnast and part of the national team.  He participated at the 2008 Summer Olympics and 2012 Summer Olympics. He also competed at world championships, including the 2011 World Artistic Gymnastics Championships in Tokyo, Japan.

References

1989 births
Living people
Spanish male artistic gymnasts
Gymnasts at the 2012 Summer Olympics
Gymnasts at the 2008 Summer Olympics
Olympic gymnasts of Spain
People from Soria
Sportspeople from the Province of Soria
Mediterranean Games bronze medalists for Spain
Mediterranean Games medalists in gymnastics
Competitors at the 2009 Mediterranean Games
20th-century Spanish people
21st-century Spanish people